Vehicle registration plates of East Timor are Australian standard 372 mm × 134 mm, and use Australian stamping dies. East Timor requires its residents to register their motor vehicles and display vehicle registration plates. Vehicle registration numbers consist of five digits, and display the letters TL or TLS, short for Timor Lorosae, the name for East Timor in Tetum (or Timor-Leste, the name of the country in Portuguese). The current format started in 2002.

Vehicle types 

Government vehicles have a similar format, but with four digits and the letter 'G'.

Portuguese Timor 

When the country was a Portuguese colony, known as Portuguese Timor, vehicle registrations followed the same format to those used in Portugal, and other colonies, using the prefix T (for Timor) or alternatively TP for Timor Português or Portuguese Timor in Portuguese in white letters on a black background.

Indonesian rule 

Following its invasion and occupation by Indonesia in 1975, East Timor (known as Timor Timur in Indonesian) was declared the country's 27th province. As a result, the letters DF were used for registrations in East Timor. This format was used until 1999, following the disintegration of East Timor from Indonesia.

References 

Transport in East Timor
East Timor
East Timor transport-related lists